James Anthony Merendino (born January 11, 1969) is an American film director and screenwriter who is best known for directing the 1998 film SLC Punk!.

Life
Merendino was born in Long Branch, New Jersey, and moved to Salt Lake City, Utah when he was six years old. He graduated from Judge Memorial Catholic High School in 1985 and went to college in Rome and Los Angeles, California where he studied Western philosophy and theology. Merendino moved to Hollywood, California when he was 19 and found work with Hollywood mogul Dan Melnick.

In 1991, Merendino was hired to direct Witchcraft IV: The Virgin Heart. His fourth film, Toughguy (1995), is a psychological thriller starring Heather Graham and introducing Carrie-Anne Moss and Balthazar Getty. His next film was A River Made to Drown In (1997). Merendino's most successful film, SLC Punk!, was released in 1998, and was a semi-autobiographical telling of his growing up in Utah. The screenplay was nominated for an Independent Spirit Award.

The 2000 film Magicians was a European co-production with Alan Arkin and Claire Forlani. Amerikana was part of the Dogma 95 movement by Lars Von Trier. Merendino directed (with Lisa Hammer) the drama film The Invisible Life of Thomas Lynch in 2009. He wrote and directed the sequel to 1998's SLC Punk!, Punk's Dead, which was released in February 2016.

Filmography

Film

Television

Awards
2000 Nominated Independent Spirit Award Best Screenplay for: SLC Punk! (1998)

References

External links

philfilms.com
spriritawards.com

Film.com

1969 births
Living people
American film directors
American male screenwriters